Love Kills may refer to:

 Love Kills (film), a 1998 American film by Mario Van Peebles
 Sid and Nancy: Love Kills, a 1986 British film by Alex Cox
 Love Kills (1973 film), an alternate name for the Italian film Cry of a Prostitute
 Love Kills (band), a Canadian alternative rock band
 Love Kills!, a 2000 album by In Strict Confidence
 "Love Kills" (Freddie Mercury song), 1984
 "Love Kills", the title track by Joe Strummer from the film Sid and Nancy: Love Kills 
 "Love Kills" (Roberto Bellarosa song), 2013
 "Love Kills", a song by The Ramones from their 1986 album Animal Boy
 "Love Kills", a song by Robyn from her 2010 album Body Talk Pt. 2